Hotel Paradies was a sitcom that aired on ZDF with a total of 27 episodes. It aired twice a week from January 16, 1990, to April 12, 1990, on Tuesdays and Thursdays at 5:50 PM. The show was written by Herbert Lichtenfeld. From episodes 1 to 12, Claus-Peter Witt was the Director, being replaced in episodes 13 to 27 with Michael Günther. The series premiere on January 16, 1990, gave ZDF 17.82 million viewers during prime time.

Plot 
The married couple Max and Lisa Lindemann run the Hotel Paradies as a family business on the Spanish island of Mallorca, which accommodates mainly German vacationers. The two sons Frank, paraplegic since a serious accident, and Michael, a motorcycle freak and heartthrob, help their parents at the reception and grandpa also makes himself useful. Among others, the park hotel owner Agostino Kroll, who had to sell the Hotel Paradies to Grandpa Lindemann some time ago due to lack of money, provides intrigue. Now wealthy, he wants the prestigious property back at any price.

The series also tells the story of Klaus Feller in parallel. In a financial emergency, he committed an insurance fraud in earlier times. Together with his then-wife Renate Feller, he faked his death and cashed in the life insurance policy taken out on him, which he consequently shared with Renate. Klaus Feller then went into hiding. Under the false name of Harald Kuhn, he now runs a car rental business and repair shop on Mallorca. The situation gets dicey when his ex-wife surprisingly shows up on the island together with her friend Jens Hartmann and Ewald Stronk, a former customer of Klaus Feller, who recognizes him by his voice. To save his own skin, Kuhn flees into the mountains to the caveman and hermit Manfred. Stronk takes up pursuit with one of Kuhn's cars, but crashes with it and has a fatal accident. The search for the culprit becomes a nerve-wracking game of patience....

The above situation is aggravated by the character Jens Hartmann. The fanatical diver is with girlfriend Renate Feller, the ex-wife of Harald Kuhn, in search of a gold treasure hidden in a shipwreck. After a long time, he actually discovers the gold, but he lacks the necessary money to salvage it. First, he asks Renate for the money, but she refuses. Therefore, in his madness, he blackmails her ex-husband Harald Kuhn: After he knows about Renate's past, he immediately threatens to go to the insurance company and expose Kuhn. Kuhn then leaves for Rio de Janeiro in Brazil with his new partner Isabel and sells Max Lindemann his car rental business. In the end Renate gives him the money for the salvage - a mistake as it turns out. Hartmann is killed during the recovery of the gold bars and Renate Feller is remanded in custody. In the course of the conversation with the detective inspector Ramirez, it comes out that Hartmann has taken out a life insurance policy in favor of Renate.

In each episode, there are also one or two additional stories in which the hotel staff are kept on their toes. The additional roles are usually played by high-profile guest stars.

Episodes
 Episode 01 (January 16, 1990): Urlaub im Paradies, Teil 1
 Episode 02 (January 16, 1990): Urlaub im Paradies, Teil 2 (Kein Grund zur Eifersucht)
 Episode 03 (January 18, 1990): Alte Dame, leicht behindert
 Episode 04 (January 23, 1990): Oma kommt
 Episode 05 (January 25, 1990): Später Frühling
 Episode 06 (January 30, 1990): Der Einsiedler
 Episode 07 (February 1, 1990): Familienkrieg
 Episode 08 (February 6, 1990): Besuch aus der Vergangenheit
 Episode 09 (February 13, 1990): Alles nur Theater
 Episode 10 (February 10, 1990): Wie du mir, so ich dir
 Episode 11 (February 15, 1990): Der Paradiesvogel
 Episode 12 (February 20, 1990): Unfallzeugen
 Episode 13 (February 22, 1990): Wer war der Täter?
 Episode 14 (February 27, 1990): Die Liebe eines Engels
 Episode 15 (March 1, 1990): Blumen für Katinka
 Episode 16 (March 6, 1990): Rosita kehrt heim
 Episode 17 (March 8, 1990): Ein Bild verschwindet
 Episode 18 (March 13, 1990): Neuer Lebensmut
 Episode 19 (March 15, 1990): Der Schminkkoffer
 Episode 20 (March 20, 1990): Zwei sind einer zuviel
 Episode 21 (March 22, 1990): Gold
 Episode 22 (March 27, 1990): Die Flucht
 Episode 23 (March 29, 1990): Das Hochzeitsfoto
 Episode 24 (April 3, 1990): Unter Mordverdacht
 Episode 25 (April 5, 1990): Ehrlich währt am längsten
 Episode 26 (April 10, 1990): Ein Haus für die Zukunft
 Episode 27 (April 12, 1990): Abschied von Mallorca

Cast 
In at least 3 episodes:

 Karin Frey as Gertrud Stronk
 Ilona Grübel as Evelyn
 Maria Ketikidou as Ines
 Daniela Lohmeyer as Natalie Reizenhein
 Isabel Navarro as maid Carmen
 Caterina Valente as Rosita Kroll
 Irina Wanka as Katinka Neumann
 Alexandra Wilcke as Anna
 Robert Atzorn as Jonas Rowalt
 Roberto Blanco as himself
 Christian Brückner as Commissioner Ramirez
 Fernando Gómez as Mauricio Ortega
 Bob Hirsch as Tommy
 Chris Howland as Butler George
 Diether Krebs as Ewald Stronk
 Walo Lüönd as hotel chef José
 Lutz Mackensy as Axel Gerloff
 Alexander May as the hermit Manfred
 Hans-Christoph Schödel as Bob
 Karl-Heinz Vosgerau as Dr. Andreas Helm

See also
List of German television series

References

External links
 
 Hotel Paradies at Fernsehserien (German)

1990 German television series debuts
1990 German television series endings
Television shows set in the Balearic Islands
German-language television shows
ZDF original programming